The Bremen-Liga, sometimes also referred to as Oberliga Bremen, is a fifth tier of the German football league system and the highest league in the German state Free Hanseatic City of Bremen. It is one of fourteen Oberligas in German football, the fifth tier of the German football league system.

Overview

1947–1963
The league was formed in 1947 as Amateurliga Bremen by thirteen clubs, including four from outside the city-state, in the newly recreated state Free Hanseatic City of Bremen which was then part of the US occupation zone in Germany.

The Free Hanseatic City of Bremen and its football association are the smallest in Germany. The state is actually separated in two halves, the cities of Bremen and Bremerhaven are split by the state of Lower Saxony.

From the start, the Amateurliga Bremen was a feeder league to the Oberliga Nord which its champion had the option of promotion to. Promotion had to be achieved through a play-off with teams from the Amateurligas of Lower Saxony, Hamburg and Schleswig-Holstein. As such, the league was the second tier of the northern German league system.

Promotion to the Oberliga however, became hard to archive for the Bremen champion which only succeeded in 1948 and 1961. This resulted however in a number of back-to-back championships, an oddity for leagues at this level in Germany where direct promotion is the standard.

After its second season, the four clubs from Lower Saxony left the league to rejoin their state's league system. To this day, the Bremen league system however continues to host a few clubs from the neighboring state, usually clubs based right at the border of Bremen.

The league was expanded to fourteen clubs in its third season, compensating for the lost clubs from Lower Saxony by promoting more local clubs. For the coming seasons, the league stuck mostly with a strength of fifteen clubs.

1963–1974
In 1963, with the introduction of the Bundesliga, the disbanding of the Oberliga Nord and the formation of the Regionalliga Nord, the league fell to tier three, but remained unchanged otherwise, with fifteen clubs as its strength. The champion of Bremen continued to have to play-off for promotion, now to the Regionalliga, with the same opposition as before and the same limited success.

The league was increased in size to sixteen clubs in 1973.

1974–1994
After the 1973–74 season, the Regionalliga Nord was disbanded in favor of the 2. Bundesliga Nord. The new Oberliga Nord was now introduced in northern Germany, as the third tier of the league system, below the 2nd Bundesliga. This meant for the Amateurliga a slip to tier four. The top two teams of the league were however promoted to the new Oberliga and the Amateurliga was renamed Verbandsliga Bremen. The system for promotion from the Verbandsliga remained mostly unchanged but the success rate for the clubs from Bremen greatly improved.

1994–2008
In 1994, the Regionalliga Nord was re-established, now as the third tier of the league system. The Oberliga Nord was in turn replaced by two parallel Oberligas, Niedersachsen/Bremen and Hamburg/Schleswig-Holstein. For the Verbandsliga Bremen, this meant a further slip, now to tier five, but also, for the first time in its history, direct promotion for the league champion.

The 1999–2000 season saw another league system change with the reduction of numbers of Regionalligas, this however had only one effect on the Verbandsliga, no promotion was available this year.

In 2004, it was decided to restore the Oberliga Nord in favor of the two separate Oberligas.

The 2006–07 league winner and runner-up, Bremer SV and FC Bremerhaven, did not receive an Oberliga licence and were not promoted.

2008 onwards
At the end of the 2007–08 season, the new 3. Liga was established and the Oberliga Nord disbanded, again. The four northern German states then were the only region without an Oberliga and the five Verbandsligen sit right below the Regionalliga Nord, parallel to the two NOFV-Oberligen. At the end of the 2007–08 season, the five winners of the northern Verbandsligas played with the sixth placed team from the Oberliga Nord for one last spot in the Regionalliga. The FC Bremerhaven was however refused a Regionalliga licence and therefore not permitted to take part in the promotion round, being replaced by the FC Oberneuland instead.

In the future seasons, promotion for the Bremen champion will only be available through a set of play-off matches with the league winners from Hamburg and Schleswig-Holstein. These three teams will compete for one promotion spot to the Regionalliga.

The Verbandsliga Bremen will however maintain its status as a tier five league. It is also the only league on this level with a single feeder league, the Landesliga Bremen, below it. In the 2007–08 season, two clubs from the Verbandsliga will be relegated to the Landesliga and two clubs promoted from there.

In the 2008–09 season, three teams from Bremen played above the Verbandsliga level, these being:

SV Werder Bremen (Bundesliga)
SV Werder Bremen II (3. Liga)
FC Oberneuland (Regionalliga Nord)

While this seems a small number, one has to consider that the Bremen FA only consists of 80 clubs.

From the 2008–09 season, the league effectively has the status of an Oberliga and is referred to as such on some websites while the DFB list the league as Bremen-Liga as its new official name.

Position of the Bremen-Liga in the league system

Source:

Founding members of the Amateurliga Bremen
Thirteen clubs, four from Niedersachsen and the other nine from Bremen, formed the league in 1947, these clubs being:

TuS Bremerhaven 93
Blumenthaler SV
SV Hemelingen
ATS Bremerhaven
Komet Bremen
Hastedter TSV
VfL Visselhövede, club based in Lower Saxony
SSV Delmenhorst, club based in Lower Saxony
Cuxhavener SV, club based in Lower Saxony
TuRa Bremen
TV Arsten
Delmenhorster BV, club based in Lower Saxony
TSV Bassum
Source:

Winners of the Bremen–Liga

Source:

Bold denotes club gained promotion.
In 1974 runner–up Bremer SV was also promoted.
In 1994 the FC Mahndorf, SC Vahr and BTS Neustadt were also promoted.
In 2005 the runner–up Brinkumer SV was promoted instead.
In 2013 the fifth placed Brinkumer SV unsuccessfully took part in the promotion round as all better placed clubs were ineligible for the Regionalliga.
In 2021 there was no champion or promotion after the decision to curtail the season during the COVID-19 pandemic in Germany.

League placings
The complete list of clubs and placings in the league since elevation to Oberliga status (2008–present):

 1 FC Oberneuland had to declare insolvency in 2013 and was relegated from the Regionalliga Nord, dropping two tiers to the Landesliga Bremen.
 2 SFL Bremerhaven withdrew its first team from the league in 2022.
 3 FC Bremerhaven was dissolved in 2012 and its football section joined FC Sparta Bremerhaven.

Key

References

Sources
 Deutschlands Fußball in Zahlen,  An annual publication with tables and results from the Bundesliga to Verbandsliga/Landesliga. DSFS.
 Kicker Almanach,  The yearbook on German football from Bundesliga to Oberliga, since 1937. Kicker Sports Magazine
 Die Deutsche Liga-Chronik 1945-2005  History of German football from 1945 to 2005 in tables. DSFS. 2006.

External links 
 Das deutsche Fussball Archiv  Historic German league tables
 The Bremen Football Association (BFV) 

 
Oberliga (football)
Football competitions in Bremen (state)
1947 establishments in Germany